Płonowo  is a village in the administrative district of Gmina Brańsk, within Bielsk County, Podlaskie Voivodeship, in north-eastern Poland.

According to the 1921 census, the village was inhabited by 147 people, among whom 141 were Roman Catholic, 2 were Orthodox, and 4 were Mosaic. At the same time, 143 inhabitants declared Polish nationality, 4 declared Jewish nationality. There were 28 residential buildings in the village.

References

Villages in Bielsk County